Memory and Destiny is the sixth full-length studio album by Polish black metal band Graveland. It was released in 2002 on No Colours Records and was limited to 2000 copies. The LP version was limited to 888 copies.

Track listing
 "Fate of Warrior" - 8:49
 "Jewel of Atlanteans" - 9:44
 "Memory and Destiny" - 10:17
 "Legion of Giants" - 9:35
 "Runes of Rise" - 9:37

Personnel

Additional personnel
 Christophe Szpajdel - logo

2002 albums
Graveland albums